Eugene Oliver Edgar Stutenroth (January 8, 1903 – July 19, 1976), known profesionally as Gene Roth, was an American film actor and film manager.

Early years 
Roth was born in Redfield, South Dakota. He was the son of a German father and a Swedish mother, who raised their three sons after the father left the family. The actor, whose billing names included Gene Stutenroth, Eugene Stutenroth, and Eugene Roth finished high school in 1920 and was a manager of a movie theater before he became an actor.

Film 
Roth appeared in over 250 films between 1922 and 1967. His first film was Daughter of the Tong (1939).

As Gene Stutenroth, he became a successful manager of movie theaters in the 1930s, and was working in this capacity when he visited Hollywood in 1944. Stutenroth was watching a movie scene being photographed when a member of the crew noticed that he looked like Ernst Hanfstaengl, then a crony of Adolf Hitler in Nazi Germany. Stutenroth was promptly fitted with makeup and costume, and became a popular character actor. His burly frame and craggy features made him ideal as an all-purpose menace, gangster, tough guy, or sheriff. Most of his acting jobs in the mid-1940s were in "B" features for Columbia Pictures and Monogram Pictures. In 1949, he abandoned his real name and shortened his screen name to "Roth." He also starred as the master villain in the Columbia serials Captain Video, Mysterious Island (1951), and The Lost Planet (1953).

Roth is remembered for his portrayals of formidable authority figures in Three Stooges comedies such as Slaphappy Sleuths, Hot Stuff, Quiz Whizz, Outer Space Jitters and (as a professor) Pies and Guys. His most memorable role was as Russian spy Bortsch hiding microfilm in Dunked in the Deep (1949), as well as its remake, Commotion on the Ocean (1956). His most famous line was his threat to Shemp Howard: "Give me dat fill-um!" ('fill-um' being 'film' with a Russian accent).

Roth later made frequent television appearances including seven episodes of The Lone Ranger from 1949 to 1954. Roth portrayed a con man in a Highway Patrol episode, Dead Patrolman in 1956. His final film appearance with the Stooges was in The Three Stooges Meet Hercules.

In 1960, Roth appeared as Davis on the TV western Cheyenne in the episode "Counterfiet Gun." 

Roth appeared three times on Gene Barry's TV western Bat Masterson, once playing "Mayor Oliver Hinton" in the 1959 episode "Election Day", and twice in 1960, once playing a miner in the episode "The Rage of Princess Anne" and another time as a crooked bartender in the episode "The Big Gamble".

Roth retired from acting in the 1960s and operated a liquor store in Hollywood.

Death 
Roth was struck and killed by a hit-and-run driver in Los Angeles, California on July 19, 1976.

Selected filmography

 Merry-Go-Round (1923) - Guard
 Daughter of the Tong (1939) - Henchman (uncredited)
 Mercy Plane (1939) - Mechanic (uncredited)
 Adventures of the Flying Cadets (1943, Serial) - Brunner - Nazi Agent [Chs. 2-4] (uncredited)
 The Strange Death of Adolf Hitler (1943) - Gen. Diebold (uncredited)
 Crazy House (1943) - Dead End Character (uncredited)
 The Cross of Lorraine (1943) - German Officer (uncredited)
 The Spider Woman (1943) - Henchman Taylor (uncredited)
 The Sultan's Daughter (1943) - Ludwig
 Song of Russia (1944) - German Army Commander (uncredited)
 Charlie Chan in the Secret Service (1944) - Luis Philipe Vega
 The Girl in the Case (1944) - Roberts (uncredited)
 Shake Hands with Murder (1944) - William Howard
 The Hitler Gang (1944) - Putzi Hanfstaengel (uncredited)
 The Contender (1944) - 1st Fight Ring Announcer (uncredited)
 Waterfront (1944) - Big Detective (uncredited)
 Are These Our Parents (1944) - Hoodlum (uncredited)
 Louisiana Hayride (1944) - Studio Gate Guard (uncredited)
 Raiders of Ghost City (1944, Serial) - Grattan (uncredited)
 Seven Doors to Death (1944) - Detective Morgan (uncredited)
 San Diego, I Love You (1944) - Stevedore (uncredited)
 Enemy of Women (1944) - Gestapo Announcer (uncredited)
 Rogues' Gallery (1944) - Mr. Joyce
 Strange Journey (1946)
 Gas House Kids in Hollywood (1947)
 Reaching from Heaven (1948) 
 Oklahoma Badlands (1948)
 The Sickle or the Cross (1949)
 Dunked in the Deep (1949) - Borscht
 Ghost of Zorro (1949) - George Crane
 Trail of the Rustlers (1950)
 The Hoodlum (1951) - Prison Warden Stevens (uncredited)
 Red Snow (1952)
 Gold Fever (1952)
 Fargo (1952)
 Wetbacks (1956) 
 The Go-Getter (1956) - Head File Clerk
 The Quiet Gun (1957) - Frank Townsend (uncredited)
 Utah Blaine (1957) - Tom Cory
 The True Story of Jesse James (1957) - Railroad Engineer (uncredited)
 Zombies of Mora Tau (1957) - Sam
 God Is My Partner (1957) - Mr. Johnson (uncredited)
 Jet Pilot (1957) - Sokolov's Batman (uncredited)
 Rockabilly Baby (1957) - Harry Johnson
 She Demons (1958) - Igor
 The Young Lions (1958) - Bavarian Café Manager (uncredited)
 Earth vs. the Spider (1958) - Sheriff Cagle
 I Want to Live! (1958) - Eric, Machinist (uncredited)
 Alaska Passage (1959) - Anderson
 The Rebel Set (1959) - Conductor, New York Train
 The Miracle of the Hills (1959) - Sheriff Crane
 The Blue Angel (1959) - Drunken Sea Captain (uncredited)
 Attack of the Giant Leeches (1959) - Sheriff Kovis
 Jet Over the Atlantic (1959)
 G.I. Blues (1960) - Businessman #1 with Klugmann (uncredited)
 Tormented (1960) - Mr. Nelson, lunch stand operator
 Cimarron (1960) - Connors (uncredited)
 Atlantis, the Lost Continent (1961) - Governor of Animals (uncredited)
 The Cat Burglar (1961) - Pete
 Ada (1961) - Chief Justice (uncredited)
 The Three Stooges Meet Hercules (1962) - Captain (uncredited)
 The Wonderful World of the Brothers Grimm (1962) - Berlin Royal Academy Representative at Train Station (uncredited)
 Stagecoach to Dancers' Rock (1962) - Jude
 Tower of London (1962) - The Tailor (uncredited)
 How the West Was Won (1962) - Riverboat Poker Player (uncredited)
 The Courtship of Eddie's Father (1963) - The Minister (uncredited)
 Twice-Told Tales (1963) - Cabman
 The Prize (1963) - Bjornefeldt (uncredited)
 The Best Man (1964) - Pennsylvania Delegate (uncredited)
 Bedtime Story (1964) - German (uncredited)
 Sylvia (1965) - Professor Eglebert (uncredited)
 The Greatest Story Ever Told (1965) - (uncredited)
 Young Dillinger (1965) - Herman, Justice of the Peace
 Torn Curtain (1966) - Guard in Post Office (uncredited)
 Rosie! (1967) - Joseph

References

External links

1903 births
1976 deaths
American male film actors
Road incident deaths in California
20th-century American male actors
People from Redfield, South Dakota